Nefertari, also known as Nefertari Meritmut, was an Egyptian queen and the first of the Great Royal Wives (or principal wives) of Ramesses the Great. She is one of the best known Egyptian queens, among such women as Cleopatra, Nefertiti, and Hatshepsut, and one of the most prominent not known or thought to have reigned in her own right. She was highly educated and able to both read and write hieroglyphs, a very rare skill at the time. She used these skills in her diplomatic work, corresponding with other prominent royals of the time. Her lavishly decorated tomb, QV66, is one of the largest and most spectacular in the Valley of the Queens. Ramesses also constructed a temple for her at Abu Simbel next to his colossal monument there.

Translation of name
There are different interpretations of the meaning of the name Nefertari. Nefertari means 'beautiful companion' and Meritmut means 'Beloved of the goddess Mut'. Some sources consider a more accurate translation for Nefertari as "the most beautiful one", "the most beautiful of them", "the most beautiful one of them all" "the most beautiful (one) among them", "the very best", or "the most beautiful of the women".

Titles 

Nefertari held many titles, including: Great of Praises (wrt-hzwt), Sweet of Love (bnrt-mrwt), Lady of Grace (nbt-im3t), Great King's Wife (hmt-niswt-wrt), his beloved (hmt-niswt-wrt meryt.f), Lady of The Two Lands (nbt-t3wy), Lady of all Lands (hnwt-t3w-nbw), Wife of the Strong Bull (hmt-k3-nxt), god's Wife (hmt-ntr), Mistress of Upper and Lower Egypt (hnwt-Shm’w-mhw). Ramesses II also named her 'The one for whom the sun shines'.

Family

Although Nefertari's family background is unknown, the discovery in her tomb of a knob inscribed with the cartouche of Pharaoh Ay has led people to speculate she was related to him. The time between the reign of Ay and Ramesses II means that Nefertari could not be a daughter of Ay and if any relation exists at all, she would be a great-granddaughter. There is no conclusive evidence linking Nefertari to the royal family of the 18th Dynasty, however. 
Nefertari married Ramesses II before he ascended the throne. Nefertari had at least four sons and two daughters. Amun-her-khepeshef, the eldest, was Crown Prince and Commander of the Troops, and Pareherwenemef would later serve in Ramesses II's army. Prince Meryatum was elevated to the position of High Priest of Re in Heliopolis. Inscriptions mention he was a son of Nefertari. Prince Meryre is a fourth son mentioned on the façade of the small temple at Abu Simbel and is thought to be another son of Nefertari. Meritamen and Henuttawy are two royal daughters depicted on the façade of the small temple at Abu Simbel and are thought to be daughters of Nefertari.

Princesses named Bak(et)mut, Nefertari, and Nebettawy are sometimes suggested as further daughters of Nefertari based on their presence in Abu Simbel, but there is no concrete evidence for this supposed family relation.

Biography 

Nefertari first appears as the wife of Ramesses II in official scenes during the first year of Ramesses II. In the tomb of Nebwenenef, Nefertari is depicted behind her husband as he elevates Nebwenenef to the position of High Priests of Amun during a visit to Abydos. Nefertari also appears in a scene next to a year 1 stela. She is depicted shaking two sistra before Taweret, Thoth, and Nut.

Nefertari is an important presence in the scenes from Luxor and Karnak. In a scene from Luxor, Nefertari appears leading the royal children. Another scene shows Nefertari at the Festival of the Mast of Amun-Min-Kamephis. The king and the queen are said to worship in the new temple and are shown overseeing the Erection of the Mast before Amen-Re attended by standard bearers. Nefertari's speech during this ceremony is recorded: 
Your beloved son, the Lord of Both Lands, Usermaatre Setepenre, has come to see you in your beautiful manifestation. He has erected for you the mast of the (pavilion)-framework. May you grant him eternity as King, and victory over those rebellious (against) His Majesty, L.P.H. 

Nefertari appears as Ramesses II's consort on many statues in both Luxor and Karnak. In Western Thebes, Nefertari is mentioned on a statuary group from Deir el-Bahari, a stela and blocks from Deir el-Medina.

The greatest honor was bestowed on Nefertari however in Abu Simbel. Nefertari is depicted in statue form at the great temple, but the small temple is dedicated to Nefertari and the goddess Hathor. The building project was started earlier in the reign of Ramesses II, and seems to have been inaugurated by ca year 25 of his reign (but not completed until ten years later).

Nefertari's prominence at court is further supported by cuneiform tablets from the Hittite city of Hattusas (today Boghazkoy, Turkey), containing Nefertari's correspondence with the king Hattusili III and his wife Puduhepa. She is mentioned in the letters as Naptera. Nefertari is known to have sent gifts to Puduhepa:

The great Queen Naptera of the land of Egypt speaks thus: Speak to my sister Puduhepa, the Great Queen of the Hatti land. I, your sister, (also) be well!! May your country be well. Now, I have learned that you, my sister, have written to me asking after my health. ... You have written to me because of the good friendship and brotherly relationship between your brother, the king of Egypt, The Great and the Storm god will bring about peace, and he will make the brotherly relationship between the Egptian king, the Great King, and his brother, the Hatti King, the Great King, last for ever... See, I have sent you a gift, in order to greet you, my sister... for your neck (a necklace) of pure gold, composed of 12 bands and weighing 88 shekels, coloured linen maklalu-material, for one royal dress for the king... A total of 12 linen garments.  

Nefertari is shown at the inaugural festivities at Abu Simbel in year 24. Her daughter Meritamen is depicted taking part in place of her mother in some of the scenes. Nefertari may well have been in failing health at this point. After her death she was buried in tomb QV66 in the Valley of the Queens.

Monuments

Abu Simbel, great temple

Nefertari appears twice as one of the royal women represented beside the colossal statues of Ramesses II that stand before the temple. To the left of the doorway, Nefertari, Queen-Mother Tuya and the king's son Amun-her-khepeshef (still called Amunhirwenemef here) flank the colossal statue of the king. To the right of the doorway Nefertari, Baketmut and the king's son Ramesses are shown with the Pharaoh.

Inside the temple Nefertari is depicted on one of the pillars in the great pillared hall worshipping Hathor of Ibshek.

On the wall of the inner pillared hall Nefertari appears behind Ramesses II. They stand before the barque of Amun, and Nefertari is shown playing the sistra. Elsewhere Nefertari and Ramesses II are shown before a barque dedicated to a deified Ramesses II. Nefertari is shown twice accompanying her husband in Triumph scenes.

Abu Simbel, small temple

The small temple at Abu Simbel was dedicated to Nefertari and Hathor of Ibshek. The dedication text on one of the buttresses states:
 "A temple of great and Mighty monuments, for the Great Royal Wife Nefertari Meryetmut, for whose sake the (very) sun does shine, given life and beloved" (Kitchen).
While on other buttresses it says:
 "King of South and North Egypt, Usermaatre Setepenre; he has made a Temple by excavation in the mountain, of eternal work(manship) in Nubia, which the King of South and North Egypt, Usermaatre Setepenre has made for the Great Royal Wife Nefertari Meryetmut, in Nubia, like Re forever and ever" (Kitchen).

The two colossal standing statues of Nefertari in front of the small temple are equal in size to those of Ramesses II. Nefertari is shown holding a sistrum. She wears a long sheet dress and she is depicted with a long wig, Hathoric cow horns, the solar disk, and tall feathers mounted on a modius.

In the interior of the temple, Nefertari appears in a variety of scenes. She is shown for instance offering to a cow (Hathor) in a papyrus thicket, offering before Khnum, Satis, and Anuket, the triad of Elephantine, and offering to Mut and Hathor.

Tomb 66 in the Valley of the Queens

The tomb of Nefertari, QV66 is one of the largest in the Valley of the Queens. It is 520 square meters, and covered with pictures of Nefertari. Her husband, the pharaoh, is not represented in any of the pictures. Nefertari can be seen wearing Greek silver earrings with a labrys design in one of the portraits. These would have been sent to her as a gift for diplomatic reasons. The tomb was robbed in antiquity. In 1904 it was rediscovered and excavated by Ernesto Schiaparelli. Several items from the tomb, including parts of gold bracelets, shabti figures and a small piece of an earring or pendant are now in the Boston Museum of Fine Arts. Additional shabti figures are in the Egyptian Museum in Cairo.

It was reported that a pair of mummified legs found in QV66 and now at the Museo Egizio of Turin may indeed be Nefertari's based on the bone structure and the age of the person, which fits the profile of Nefertari.

References

External links 

 The tomb of Nefertari Merytmut

 
13th-century BC births
1250s BC deaths
13th-century BC Egyptian women
13th-century BC clergy
Wives of Ramesses II